This is a comprehensive list of victories of the  cycling team. The races are categorized according to the UCI Continental Circuits rules.

1992 – Chazal 
Paris–Camembert Lepetit, Patrice Esnault

1993 – Chazal 
Paris–Camembert Lepetit, Oleg Kozlitine
GP d´Isbergues, Jaan Kirsipuu

1994 – Chazal 
Profronde van Oostvoorne, Marco Vermey

1996 – Petit Casino
Stage 1 Critérium du Dauphiné, Artūras Kasputis

1997 – Casino–AG2R Prévoyance

Grand Prix du Midi Libre, Alberto Elli
A Travers le Morbihan, Christophe Agnolutto
Tour du Limousin, Lauri Aus
Tour du Haut Var, Rodolfo Massi
Stage 4 Volta a la Comunidad Valenciana, Rodolfo Massi
Stage 4 Paris – Nice, Pascal Chanteur
Cholet – Pays De Loire, Jaan Kirsipuu
Tour de Vendée, Jaan Kirsipuu
Grand Prix de Plumelec-Morbihan, Christophe Agnolutto
 Overall Tour de Suisse, Christophe Agnolutto
Stage 3, Christophe Agnolutto
 National Road Championship, Stéphane Barthe
 National Road Championship, Marc Streel
 Overall Tour de Pologne, Rolf Järmann
Stage 1 Tour de Pologne, Lauri Aus
Stages 3 & 4 Tour de Pologne, Jaan Kirsipuu

1998 – Casino–AG2R Prévoyance

Decoplant Grand Prix, Bo Hamburger
Route Adélie de Vitré, Jaan Kirsipuu
Four Days of Dunkirk, Alexander Vinokourov
 Overall Tour Méditerranéen, Rodolfo Massi
 Overall Tour de Picardie, Alexander Vinokourov
 Overall Tour du Poitou Charentes, Lauri Aus
 Overall Tour du Limousin, Vincent Cali
Circuit de Lorraine Professionnels, Alexander Vinokourov
Vuelta Ciclista a Murcia – Costa Calida, Alberto Elli
GP d'Ouverture La Marseillaise, Marco Saligari
Trofeo Laigueglia, Pascal Chanteur
Classic Haribo, Lauri Aus
 Overall Volta a la Comunidad Valenciana, Pascal Chanteur
Stage 2, Bo Hamburger
 Overall Tirreno – Adriatico, Rolf Järmann
Cholet – Pays De Loire, Jaan Kirsipuu
Stage 1 Setmana Catalana de Ciclisme, Stéphane Barthe
Stage 2 Setmana Catalana de Ciclisme, Rolf Järmann
Stage 2 Critérium International, Rodolfo Massi
GP de la Ville de Rennes, Pascal Chanteur
Stage 2 Vuelta Ciclista al Pais Vasco, Bo Hamburger
Stage 4 Vuelta Ciclista al Pais Vasco, Alberto Elli
La Flèche Wallonne, Bo Hamburger
GP de Denain Porte du Hainaut, Jaan Kirsipuu
Amstel Gold Race, Rolf Järmann
Stage 5 Tour de Romandie, Christophe Agnolutto
GP de Villers Cotterêts, Jaan Kirsipuu
 National Road Championship, Jaan Kirsipuu
 National Time Trial Championship, Jaan Kirsipuu
Stage 8 Tour de France, Jacky Durand
Stage 10 Tour de France, Rodolfo Massi
 Overall Tour of Denmark, Marc Streel
Stage 3 Vuelta a España, Jaan Kirsipuu
Stage 6 Tour de Pologne, Alexander Vinokourov
Stage 7 Tour de Pologne, Jacky Durand
Paris – Tours, Jacky Durand

1999 – Casino–AG2R Prévoyance

Étoile de Bessèges, David Lefevre
Grand Prix du Midi Libre, Benoit Salmon
Tour de Picardie, Jaan Kirsipuu
La Côte Picarde, Pascal Chanteur
Circuit de Lorraine Professionnels, Artūras Kasputis
 Overall Volta a la Comunidad Valenciana, Alexander Vinokourov
Stage 5b, Alexander Vinokourov
Stage 3 Paris – Nice, Jaan Kirsipuu
Stage 4 Paris – Nice, Laurent Roux
Cholet – Pays De Loire, Jaan Kirsipuu
Stage 1 Critérium International, Stéphane Barthe
Tour de Vendée, Jaan Kirsipuu
Trophée des Grimpeurs, Laurent Roux
 Overall Critérium du Dauphiné, Alexander Vinokourov
Stage 1, Christophe Oriol
Stage 2, Alexander Vinokourov
Stage 1 Tour of Sweden, Jaan Kirsipuu
 National Time Trial Championship, Gilles Maignan
 National Time Trial Championship, Jaan Kirsipuu
 National Road Championship, Jaan Kirsipuu
Stage 1 Tour de France, Jaan Kirsipuu
Stage 3 Tour du Poitou Charentes et de la Vienne, Stéphane Barthe
Stage 5 Tour du Poitou Charentes et de la Vienne, Jaan Kirsipuu
Stage 3 Tour de Pologne, Jaan Kirsipuu
GP d´Isbergues, Lauri Aus

2000 – AG2R Prévoyance

 Overall Tour Down Under, Gilles Maignan
Stages 1, 3 & 6 Étoile de Bessèges, Jaan Kirsipuu
Stage 1 Tour Méditerranéen, Jaan Kirsipuu
Classic Haribo, Jaan Kirsipuu
Stage 2 Paris – Nice, Jaan Kirsipuu
Stage 5a Setmana Catalana de Ciclisme, Jaan Kirsipuu
Tour de Vendée, Jaan Kirsipuu
Stage 2 Four Days of Dunkirk, Artūras Kasputis
Stage 7 Four Days of Dunkirk, Jaan Kirsipuu
 National Road Championship, Lauri Aus
 National Time Trial Championship, Lauri Aus
Stage 7 Tour de France, Christophe Agnolutto
Stage 4b Tour of Denmark, Artūras Kasputis
Stage 5 Tour of Denmark, Jaan Kirsipuu
Stage 4 Tour du Poitou Charentes et de la Vienne, Gilles Maignan
Stages 2, 3 & 4 Tour de Pologne, Jaan Kirsipuu

2001 – AG2R Prévoyance

A Travers le Morbihan, Gilles Maignan
Stages 5 & 6 Tour Méditerranéen, Jaan Kirsipuu
Route Adélie de Vitré, Jaan Kirsipuu
GP de Denain Porte du Hainaut, Jaan Kirsipuu
Stages 1, 2, 4 & 7 Four Days of Dunkirk, Jaan Kirsipuu
Grand Prix de Plumelec-Morbihan, Gilles Maignan
Stage 2 Tour de Luxembourg, Jaan Kirsipuu
 National Time Trial Championship, Jaan Kirsipuu
 National Road Championship, Ludovic Capelle
Stage 6 Tour de France, Jaan Kirsipuu
Overall Tour de la Somme, Laurent Estadieu
Stage 5 Tour de l´Ain, David Delrieu
Stage 6 Tour of Denmark, Jaan Kirsipuu
Stage 2 Tour du Poitou Charentes et de la Vienne, Jaan Kirsipuu
Stage 5 Tour du Poitou Charentes et de la Vienne, Lauri Aus
Stage 1 Tour de Pologne, Jaan Kirsipuu

2002 – AG2R Prévoyance

Les 3 Jours de Vaucluse, Mark Scanlon
Stages 4 & 5 Étoile de Bessèges, Jaan Kirsipuu
Classic Haribo, Jaan Kirsipuu
Kuurne–Bruxelles–Kuurne, Jaan Kirsipuu
Tartu GP, Jaan Kirsipuu
 National Road Championship, Jaan Kirsipuu
 National Road Championship, Makr Scanlon
 National Time Trial Championship, Jaan Kirsipuu
Stage 5 Tour de France, Jaan Kirsipuu
 Overall Tour de l´Ain, Christophe Oriol
Stage 3, Christophe Oriol

2003 – AG2R Prévoyance

 Overall Tour Down Under, Mikel Astarloza
GP Costa degli Etruschi, Jaan Kirsipuu
Stage 5 Étoile de Bessèges, Jaan Kirsipuu
Classic Haribo, Jaan Kirsipuu
Overall Johan Museeuw Classics, Jaan Kirsipuu
Stage 2, Jaan Kirsipuu
Overall Tour de Normandie, Samuel Dumoulin
 Overall Critérium International, Laurent Borchard
Stage 2, Laurent Borchard
Tour de Vendée, Jaan Kirsipuu
Paris–Camembert Lepetit, Laurent Borchard
Stage 2 Tour de Romandie, Yuriy Krivtsov
Stage 3 Four Days of Dunkirk, Jaan Kirsipuu
STage 6 Four Days of Dunkirk, Jean-Patrick Nazon
Tartu GP, Jaan Kirsipuu
Tro-Bro Léon, Samuel Dumoulin
Stage 2 Route du Sud, Ludovic Turpin
 National Road Championship, Mark Scanlon
 National Time Trial Championship, Jaan Kirsipuu
 National Time Trial Championship, Inigo Bernardez
Stage 20 Tour de France, Jean-Patrick Nazon
Stage 2 Tour de la Région Wallonne, Stéphane Berges
Stage 1 Tour of Denmark, Mark Scanlon
Stage 3 Tour de l´Ain, Ludovic Turpin
Stage 6 Tour of Denmark, Jaan Kirsipuu
GP Ouest France-Plouay, Andy Flickinger
Stage 3 Tour du Poitou Charentes et de la Vienne, Jaan Kirsipuu

2004 – AG2R Prévoyance

 Overall Étoile de Bessèges, Laurent Borchard
Stages 2 & 5, Jaan Kirsipuu
Stage 4, Laurent Borchard
Stages 1 & 2 Johan Museeuw Classics, Jaan Kirsipuu
Classic Loire Atlantique, Erki Pütsep
Stage 1 Critérium International, Jean-Patrick Nazon
Tro-Bro Léon, Samuel Dumoulin
E.O.S Tallinn GP, Mark Scanlon
Tartu GP, Mark Scanlon
Stage 3 Critérium du Dauphiné, Nicloas Portal
 National Road Championship, Erki Pütsep
 National Time Trial Championship, Jaan Kirsipuu
 National Time Trial Championship, Yuriy Krivtsov
Stage 1 Tour de France, Jaan Kirsipuu
Stage 3 Tour de France, Jean-Patrick Nazon
Stage 4 Tour de la Région Wallonne, Jaan Kirsipuu
Stage 3a Tour de l´Ain, Jean-Patrick Nazon

2005 – AG2R Prévoyance

GP de la Ville de Rennes, Ludovic Turpin
Stage 2a Circuit Cycliste Sarthe, Andy Flickinger
Tour du Finistère, Simon Gerrans
Stage 2 Bayern–Rundfahrt, Jean-Patrick Nazon
Tartu GP, Thomas Vaitkus
Stage 2 Critérium du Dauphiné, Samuel Dumoulin
Stage 1 Boucles de la Mayenne, Alexandre Usov
Stage 2 Boucles de la Mayenne, Laurent Mangel
Tour du Doubs, Philip Deignan
Stage 2 Tour du Limousin, Samuel Dumoulin
GP Industria e Commercio Artigianato Carnaghese, Simon Gerrans
Stage 1 International Hessen Rundfahrt, Jean-Patrick Nazon
Stage 4 International Hessen Rundfahrt, Alexandre Usov
Memorial Rik Van Steenbergen, Jean-Patrick Nazon
Overall Tour de la Somme, Erki Pütsep
Stage 1, Erki Pütsep
Jayco Herald Sun Tour, Simon Gerrans

2006 – AG2R Prévoyance

 Overall Tour Down Under, Simon Gerrans
Stage 1, Simon Gerrans
Stage 6 Tour de Langkawi, Laurent Mangel
 Overall Tour Méditerranéen, Cyril Dessel
Stage 4, Cyril Dessel
Le Samyn, Renaud Dion
Route Adélie de Vitré, Samuel Dumoulin
Stage 9 Giro d'Italia, Tomas Vaitkus
Stage 1 Circuit de Lorraine, Jean-Patrick Nazon
Stage 4 Circuit de Lorraine, Christophe Riblon
Stage 5 Critérium du Dauphiné Libéré, Ludovic Turpin
Stage 2 Route du Sud, Jean-Patrick Nazon
 Road Race Championships, Erki Pütsep
Stage 8 Tour de France, Sylvain Calzati
 Overall Tour de l'Ain, Cyril Dessel
Stage 1, Cyril Dessel
Stage 19 Vuelta a España, José Luis Arrieta
 Overall Herald Sun Tour, Simon Gerrans

2007 – AG2R Prévoyance

 Overall Tour Down Under, Martin Elmiger
Stage 4 Tour Méditerranéen, Rinaldo Nocentini
Stage 1 Paris–Nice, Jean-Patrick Nazon
GP Miguel Induráin, Rinaldo Nocentini
Stage 1 Circuit de Lorraine, Ludovic Turpin
Grand Prix de Plumelec-Morbihan, Simon Gerrans
Grand Prix of Aargau Canton, John Gadret
 Overall Critérium du Dauphiné Libéré, Christophe Moreau
Stages 2 & 4, Christophe Moreau
Stage 1 Route du Sud, Jean-Patrick Nazon
 Road Race Championships, Christophe Moreau
 Overall Tour de l'Ain, John Gadret
Stage 3, John Gadret
Stage 4 Tour du Limousin, Alexandre Usov
Tour de la Somme, Christophe Riblon
Grand Prix d'Isbergues, Martin Elmiger

2008 – Ag2r–La Mondiale

Stage 7 Tour de Langkawi, Alexandre Usov
Gran Premio di Lugano, Rinaldo Nocentini
Stage 5 Four Days of Dunkirk, Cyril Dessel
Stage 2 Tour de Picardie, Martin Elmiger
Stage 3 Volta a Catalunya, Cyril Dessel
Grand Prix of Aargau Canton, Lloyd Mondory
Stage 4 Critérium du Dauphiné Libéré, Cyril Dessel
 Time Trial Championships, Tanel Kangert
 Road Race Championships, Alexandre Pliușchin
Stage 9 Tour de France, Vladimir Efimkin
Stage 16 Tour de France, Cyril Dessel
Stage 2 Paris–Corrèze, Lloyd Mondory
Stage 4 Tour de l'Ain, John Gadret

2009 – Ag2r–La Mondiale
Stage 7 Tour of California, Rinaldo Nocentini
Stage 1 Route du Sud, Nicolas Rousseau
Stage 3 Route du Sud, Christophe Riblon
 Road Race Championships, Nicolas Roche
Stage 3a Tour de l'Ain, Ludovic Turpin

2010 – Ag2r–La Mondiale

Stage 2 La Tropicale Amissa Bongo, Julien Loubet
Stage 3 La Tropicale Amissa Bongo, Nicolas Rousseau
 Overall Tour Méditerranéen, Rinaldo Nocentini
Stage 1 Tour du Haut Var, Rinaldo Nocentini
Boucles du Sud Ardèche, Christophe Riblon
Stages 2 & 5 Circuit de la Sarthe, Anthony Ravard
 Overall Four Days of Dunkirk, Martin Elmiger
Stage 4, Martin Elmiger
Stage 2a Route du Sud, Blel Kadri
 Road Race Championships, Martin Elmiger
Stage 14 Tour de France, Christophe Riblon
Stage 3 Tour de Wallonie, Kristof Goddaert
Stage 3 Tour de l'Ain, Maxime Bouet
Stage 2 Tour du Poitou-Charentes, Anthony Ravard
Châteauroux Classic, Anthony Ravard
GP de la Somme, Martin Elmiger
Paris–Bourges, Anthony Ravard

2011 – Ag2r–La Mondiale

 Overall Étoile de Bessèges, Anthony Ravard
Stage 2, Lloyd Mondory
Stage 11 Giro d'Italia, John Gadret
Châteauroux Classic, Anthony Ravard
Stage 3 Tour du Poitou Charentes, Anthony Ravard
Stage 3 Tour of Beijing, Nicolas Roche

2012 – Ag2r–La Mondiale

 Time Trial Championships, Ben Gastauer
Stage 3 Circuit de Lorraine, Sébastien Hinault
Stage 6 Tour of California, Sylvain Georges
Boucles de l'Aulne, Sébastien Hinault
Stage 4 Route du Sud, Manuel Belletti

2013 – Ag2r–La Mondiale

Stage 5 Étoile de Bessèges, Samuel Dumoulin
Stage 4 Tour Méditerranéen, Jean-Christophe Péraud
Roma Maxima, Blel Kadri
Stage 1a Giro del Trentino, Maxime Bouet
Grand Prix de Plumelec-Morbihan, Samuel Dumoulin
 Young rider classification in the Giro d'Italia, Carlos Betancur
Stage 18 Tour de France, Christophe Riblon
Stage 2 Tour de Pologne, Christophe Riblon
 Overall Tour de l'Ain, Romain Bardet
Overall French Road Cycling Cup, Samuel Dumoulin

2014 – Ag2r–La Mondiale

Stage 5 Tour Méditerranéen, Jean-Christophe Péraud
 Overall Tour du Haut Var, Carlos Betancur
Stage 1, Carlos Betancur
La Drôme Classic, Romain Bardet
 Overall Paris–Nice, Carlos Betancur
Stages 5 & 6, Carlos Betancur
Classic Loire Atlantique, Alexis Gougeard
 Overall Critérium International, Jean-Christophe Péraud
Grand Prix de la Somme, Yauheni Hutarovich
Teams classification Giro d'Italia
Boucles de l'Aulne, Alexis Gougeard
 National Road Race Championships, Yauheni Hutarovich
Teams classification Tour de France
Stage 8, Blel Kadri
Stage 1 Tour de Pologne, Yauheni Hutarovich
Stage 4 Vuelta a Burgos, Lloyd Mondory
Stage 2 Tour du Gévaudan Languedoc-Roussillon, Alexis Vuillermoz

2015 – AG2R La Mondiale

 Overall   Tour du Haut Var, Ben Gastauer
Stage 1, Ben Gastauer
La Drôme Classic, Samuel Dumoulin
Classic Loire Atlantique, Alexis Gougeard
Stage 3 Volta a Catalunya, Domenico Pozzovivo
 Overall Critérium International, Jean-Christophe Péraud
Stage 3, Jean-Christophe Péraud
Grand Prix de la Somme, Quentin Jaurégui
Stage 3 Giro del Trentino, Domenico Pozzovivo
Stage 3 Four Days of Dunkirk, Alexis Gougeard
Grand Prix de Plumelec-Morbihan, Alexis Vuillermoz
Stage 5 Critérium du Dauphiné, Romain Bardet
 Time Trial Championships, Hugo Houle
Stage 8 Tour de France, Alexis Vuillermoz
Stage 18 Tour de France, Romain Bardet
Stage 4 Tour de l'Ain, Pierre Latour
Aquece Rio – International Road Cycling Challenge, Alexis Vuillermoz
Stage 19 Vuelta a España, Alexis Gougeard
Stage 2 Tour du Gévaudan Languedoc-Roussillon, Alexis Vuillermoz
 Overall Tour de l'Eurométropole, Alexis Gougeard
Prologue, Alexis Gougeard
Giro del Piemonte, Jan Bakelants
Giro dell'Emilia, Jan Bakelants

2016 – AG2R La Mondiale

Stage 4 La Méditerranéenne, Jan Bakelants
Paris–Camembert, Cyril Gautier
La Roue Tourangelle, Samuel Dumoulin
Grand Prix de Plumelec-Morbihan, Samuel Dumoulin
Boucles de l'Aulne, Samuel Dumoulin
Stage 19 Tour de France, Romain Bardet
Stage 20 Vuelta a España, Pierre Latour
Tour du Doubs, Samuel Dumoulin

2017 – AG2R La Mondiale

Stage 1 Tour du Haut Var, Samuel Dumoulin
Stage 2 Tour La Provence, Alexandre Geniez
Stage 4 Tour of the Alps, Matteo Montaguti
Grand Prix de Plumelec-Morbihan, Alexis Vuillermoz
Stage 6 Tour de Suisse, Domenico Pozzovivo
 Time Trial Championships, Pierre Latour
 Road Race Championships, Oliver Naesen
Stage 12 Tour de France, Romain Bardet
Polynormande, Alexis Gougeard
Stage 4 Tour de l'Ain, Alexandre Geniez
Paris–Bourges, Rudy Barbier
Tre Valli Varesine, Alexandre Geniez
Stage 3 Tour du Limousin, Cyril Gautier
Grand Prix d'Isbergues, Benoît Cosnefroy
Stage 2 Rhône-Alpes Isère Tour, Benoît Cosnefroy
 World Championships U23 Road Race, Benoît Cosnefroy

2018 – AG2R La Mondiale

Grand Prix Cycliste la Marseillaise, Alexandre Geniez
 Overall Étoile de Bessèges, Tony Gallopin
Stage 5 (ITT), Tony Gallopin
 Overall Tour La Provence, Alexandre Geniez
Prologue, Alexandre Geniez
Classic Sud-Ardèche, Romain Bardet
Route Adélie de Vitré, Silvan Dillier
Stage 2, Route d'Occitanie, Clément Venturini
 Lithuania National Championships, Road Race, Gediminas Bagdonas
 Lithuania National Championships, Time Trial, Gediminas Bagdonas
 French National Championships, Time Trial, Pierre Latour
 White Jersey Tour de France, Pierre Latour
Bretagne Classic, Oliver Naesen
Stage 7 Vuelta a España, Tony Gallopin
Stage 12 Vuelta a España, Alexandre Geniez
Tour de Vendée, Nico Denz

2019 – AG2R La Mondiale

 National Cyclo-cross championships, Clément Venturini
La Drôme Classic, Alexis Vuillermoz
 Overall Circuit Cycliste Sarthe – Pays de la Loire, Alexis Gougeard
Stage 3, Alexis Gougeard
Paris–Camembert, Benoît Cosnefroy
Stage 2 Tour de l'Ain, Alexandre Geniez
Stage 17 Giro d'Italia, Nans Peters
Grand Prix de Plumelec-Morbihan, Benoît Cosnefroy
Boucles de l'Aulne, Alexis Gougeard
Prologue Boucles de la Mayenne, Dorian Godon
 Lithuania National Championships, Time Trial, Gediminas Bagdonas
 Mountains classification, Tour de France, Romain Bardet
La Poly Normande, Benoît Cosnefroy
Stage 7 BinckBank Tour, Oliver Naesen
 Overall Tour du Limousin, Benoît Cosnefroy
Stage 3 Tour du Limousin, Benoît Cosnefroy
 Mountains classification Vuelta a España, Geoffrey Bouchard

2020 – AG2R La Mondiale

 National Cyclo-cross championships, Clément Venturini
Grand Prix Cycliste la Marseillaise, Benoît Cosnefroy
 Overall Étoile de Bessèges, Benoît Cosnefroy
Stage 4 Route d'Occitanie, Benoît Cosnefroy
Stage 8 Tour de France, Nans Peters
Paris–Camembert, Dorian Godon

2021 – AG2R Citroën Team

 National Cyclo-cross championships, Clément Venturini
Grand Prix Cycliste la Marseillaise, Aurélien Paret-Peintre
 Mountains classification Giro d'Italia, Geoffrey Bouchard
Stage 12, Andrea Vendrame
Tour du Finistère, Benoît Cosnefroy
Stage 1 Route d'Occitanie, Andrea Vendrame
Paris–Camembert, Dorian Godon
Stage 9 Tour de France, Ben O'Connor
Stage 2 Tour de Limousin, Dorian Godon
Bretagne Classic, Benoît Cosnefroy
Tour du Jura, Benoît Cosnefroy
Stage 20 Vuelta a España, Clément Champoussin
Tour du Doubs, Dorian Godon
Boucles de l'Aulne, Stan Dewulf

2022 – AG2R Citroën Team

Cholet-Pays de la Loire, Marc Sarreau
Stage 3 Volta a Catalunya, Ben O'Connor
Tour du Jura, Ben O'Connor
Stage 1 Tour of the Alps, Geoffrey Bouchard
 Time Trial Championships, Bob Jungels
Stage 9 Tour de France, Bob Jungels
Stage 3 Vuelta a Burgos, Bastien Tronchon
Stages 1, 2 & 3 Tour Poitou-Charentes en Nouvelle Aquitaine, Marc Sarreau
Grand Prix Cycliste de Québec, Benoît Cosnefroy

Supplementary statistics
Sources

1992 to 2012

2013 to present

References

Chazal
Wins